Santia Tri Kusuma (born 27 April 1981) is an Indonesian cyclist. She competed in the women's points race at the 2004 Summer Olympics.

References

1981 births
Living people
Indonesian female cyclists
Olympic cyclists of Indonesia
Cyclists at the 2004 Summer Olympics
Sportspeople from Malang
Asian Games medalists in cycling
Cyclists at the 2002 Asian Games
Cyclists at the 2010 Asian Games
Asian Games silver medalists for Indonesia
Asian Games bronze medalists for Indonesia
Medalists at the 2002 Asian Games
Medalists at the 2010 Asian Games
Competitors at the 2005 Southeast Asian Games
Competitors at the 2007 Southeast Asian Games
Competitors at the 2009 Southeast Asian Games
Competitors at the 2011 Southeast Asian Games
Southeast Asian Games medalists in cycling
Southeast Asian Games gold medalists for Indonesia
Southeast Asian Games bronze medalists for Indonesia
21st-century Indonesian women